Shirley is a 1922 British silent drama film directed by A. V. Bramble and starring Carlotta Breese, Clive Brook, Elizabeth Irving and Mabel Terry-Lewis. It is based on the 1849 novel Shirley by Charlotte Brontë.

Cast
 Carlotta Breese as Shirley
 Clive Brook as Robert Moore
 Elizabeth Irving as Caroline Helston
 Mabel Terry-Lewis as Mrs. Prior
 Harvey Braban as Nunnally
 Joe Nightingale
 David Miller

References

External links

1922 films
British drama films
Films based on British novels
Films based on works by Charlotte Brontë
Films directed by A. V. Bramble
Ideal Film Company films
British silent feature films
British black-and-white films
1922 drama films
Adaptations of works by the Brontë family
1920s English-language films
1920s British films
Silent drama films